Ina-Yoko Teutenberg (born 28 October 1974) is a German former road bicycle racer, who competed professionally between 2000 and 2013 for the Red Bull Frankfurt, Saturn Cycling Team and  teams. She took over 200 wins during her career, including 11 stages of the Giro Rosa, the 2009 Tour of Flanders, and being part of the  team that won the World Team Time Trial Championship in 2012. She now works as a directeur sportif for UCI Women's Team .

Career
Born in Düsseldorf, West Germany, Teutenberg began racing bicycles at age 6, alongside her two brothers Sven Teutenberg and Lars Teutenberg. She competed for Germany at the 2000 and 2012 Summer Olympics. Teutenberg retired from competition in 2013, after suffering concussion in a serious accident that year.

After her retirement, she worked with USA Cycling on a temporary basis, directing their junior men's and women's programmes in Europe, before co-directing 's women's team. In August 2018, Trek Bicycle Corporation announced that Teutenberg would be appointed as head director of their new women's team, for its debut in 2019. On 30 May 2019 it was announced that Teutenberg would become the Women's Road Sports Director for the World Championships and Olympic Games, starting her role at the World Championships that year.

Personal life
She was one of 23 LGBT Olympians at the London Games.

Major results 

1993
1st  Points race, National Track Championships
1996
1st Overall Thüringen Rundfahrt der Frauen
1997
1st  Points race, National Track Championships
1998
1st Stage 4 RaboSter Zeeuwsche Eilanden
1st Stage 4 Women's Challenge
 Holland Ladies Tour
1st Stages 4 & 5
1999
 Women's Challenge
1st Stages 7 & 12
2000
 Women's Challenge
1st Stages 8 & 9
2nd Overall Holland Ladies Tour
1st Stage 5a
2nd Primavera Rosa (ITA) (World Cup)
2001
1st Stage 3 Thüringen Rundfahrt der Frauen
 Women's Challenge
1st Stages 10 & 13
1st Stage 4 Tour of the Gila
1st Clarendon Cup
2002
1st Stage 3 Holland Ladies Tour
1st Stage 5 Thüringen Rundfahrt der Frauen
 Tour de l'Aude
1st Stages 1, 3, 4 & 5b
1st Clarendon Cup
2003
 Tour de l'Aude
1st Stages 4b & 9
1st Stage 4 Solano Bicycle Classic
 Redlands Bicycle Classic
1st Stages 1 & 4
1st Stage 4 Tour of the Gila
 Tour de Toona
1st Stages 2 & 7
1st Stage 5 Holland Ladies Tour
2005
 Valley of the Sun Stage Race
1st Stages 2 & 3
 Redlands Bicycle Classic
1st Stages 2 & 3
1st Stage 3 Tour of the Gila
1st Richmond Cycling Classic
1st Liberty Classic
 Tour de Toona
1st Stages 2 & 5
1st Stage 4a Holland Ladies Tour
2006
2nd Overall UCI Women's Road World Cup
1st Geelong World Cup
1st Stage 4 Geelong Women's Tour
 Tour of New Zealand
1st Stages 2 & 3
1st Stage 1 Damesronde van Drenthe
 Tour de l'Aude
1st Stages 5 & 10
1st Stage 4 Krasna Lipa Tour Feminine
1st Lowland International Rotterdam Tour
 Holland Ladies Tour
1st Stages 2 & 3
1st Stage 4b Giro della Toscana Int. Femminile – Memorial Michela Fanini
1st Commerce Bank Triple Crown of Cycling
1st Reading Classic
2007
 Geelong Women's Tour
1st Stages 2 & 3
 Tour of New Zealand
1st Stages 1 & 6
1st Stage 2 Redlands Bicycle Classic
1st Stage 9 Tour de l'Aude
Commerce Bank Triple Crown of Cycling
1st Commerce Bank Lancaster Classic
1st Commerce Bank Reading Classic
1st Commerce Bank Liberty Classic Philadelphia
1st Stage 3 RaboSter Zeeuwsche Eilanden
 Giro d'Italia Femminile
1st Stages 4 & 7
 Trophée d'Or Féminin
1st Stages 4 & 5
3rd 2007 Novilon Internationale Damesronde van Drenthe
2008
1st Stage 6 Tour of New Zealand
1st Central Valley Classic
1st Drentse 8 van Dwingeloo
1st Stage 4 Gracia–Orlová
 Tour de l'Aude
1st Stages 5 & 8
1st Commerce Bank Allentown Classic
1st Commerce Bank Reading Classic
1st Commerce Bank Liberty Classic Philadelphia
1st Overall RaboSter Zeeuwsche Eilanden
1st Stages 2 & 3
 Giro Donne
1st Stages 1, 2, 3 & 8
 La Route de France
1st Prologue & Stage 1
2nd Overall Holland Ladies Tour
1st Stages 1, 4 & 6
 Giro della Toscana
1st Stages 1, 2b & 4
1st Central Valley Classic 2008
1st Visalia 2008
2009
1st  Road race, National Road Championships
1st Merced Criterium, California
1st Merced Road Race, California
1st Overall San Dimas Stage Race
1st Stages 2 & 3
1st Overall Redlands Classic
1st Stages 1 & 2
1st Ronde Van Vlaanderen World Cup
1st Drenthe 8 Van Dwingeloo
1st Ronde van Gelderland
1st Stage 4 Gracia–Orlová
 Tour de l'Aude
1st Stages 1, 3 & 9
1st Commerce Bank Liberty Classic Philadelphia
1st Overall RaboSter Zeeuwsche Eilanden
1st Stage 4 Giro Donne
 La Route de France
1st Stages 1 & 3
1st Stage 5 Holland Ladies Tour
1st Stage 5 Giro della Toscana
2010
1st Overall San Dimas Stage Race
1st Stage 3 
1st Overall Redlands Classic
1st Stage 1 
1st Drenthe 8 Van Dwingeloo
1st Overall Tour of Chongming Island
1st Stages 1 & 3
1st Tour of Chongming Island World Cup
 Tour de l'Aude
1st Points classification
1st Stages 3, 6 & 9
1st Commerce Bank Liberty Classic Philadelphia
 Giro Donne
1st Stages 1, 2, 3 & 4
1st Stage 1 La Route de France
1st Stage 1 Holland Ladies Tour
1st Stage 1 Giro della Toscana
2011
1st  Road race, National Road Championships
1st Stage 3 Tour of New Zealand
1st Stage 2 Energiewacht Tour
1st Ronde van Gelderland
1st Overall Tour of Chongming Island
1st Points classification
1st Stage 2
1st Tour of Chongming Island World Cup
1st Stage 1 Giro del Trentino
 Giro d'Italia Femminile
1st Stages 4 & 10
 Thüringen Rundfahrt der Frauen
1st Stages 1 & 2
 Trophée d'Or Féminin
1st Stages 1 & 2 (TTT)
 Giro della Toscana
1st Stages 1 (TTT), 2 & 4a
2012
1st Overall Energiewacht Tour
1st Points classification
1st Stages 2, 3 & 4b (TTT)
1st Commerce Bank Liberty Classic Philadelphia
1st Stage 1 Emakumeen Euskal Bira
 Thüringen Rundfahrt der Frauen
1st Stages 1 & 2
1st Open de Suède Vårgårda TTT
 Holland Ladies Tour
1st Stages 1, 2 & 5
 UCI Road World Championships
1st Team time trial (with Ellen van Dijk, Charlotte Becker, Amber Neben, Evelyn Stevens and Trixi Worrack)
6th Time trial
 4th Road race, Olympic Games

References

External links 

  
 
 
 
 
 
 

1974 births
Living people
Sportspeople from Düsseldorf
German female cyclists
Olympic cyclists of Germany
Cyclists at the 2000 Summer Olympics
Cyclists at the 2012 Summer Olympics
Lesbian sportswomen
German LGBT sportspeople
LGBT cyclists
UCI Road World Champions (women)
Cyclists from North Rhine-Westphalia